League and Self-Defense (LiS —  also means fox in Polish) was the proposed name for a new Polish political grouping which was to arise from  an alliance or merger between the left-wing populist Self-Defense of the Republic of Poland (SRP) and the national conservative Christian right League of Polish Families (LPR) in July 2007. However, the merger failed to materialise, and LiS didn't go anywhere beyond the stage of a proposal.

The decision for the synthesis of the two parties arose following a crisis within Poland's ruling three party coalition, of the dominant Law and Justice (PiS) party, and junior partners SRP and LPR. On 9 July, SORP leader, Andrzej Lepper, was dismissed from his position as Minister for Agriculture following a secret investigation by the Central Anticorruption Bureau (CBA) which attempted to link him and his department to corruptive practices. Lepper protested his innocence and claimed to have been the victim of a politically motivated 'sting' operation, initiated by PM Kaczynski and PiS. He demanded that a parliamentary inquiry be conducted to investigate the legality and motivation of the CBA operation mounted against him. Lepper's stance drew him support from his own SORP party and the LPR. On 16 July 2007, a merger of the two parties was announced at a press conference conducted by Lepper and his LPR counterpart, Roman Giertych. The nature of this new 'LiS' was not made clear, and the leaders could not give any  specifics as to whether LiS would take the form of a newly unified party or simply an electoral alliance of two autonomous parties. It was indicated however, that the platform of this new alliance would be mainly eurosceptic and anti-reformist.

By early September it was clear that LiS would not arise. The membership of the two parties had not been properly consulted as to their support for this idea, and the merits of the proposition had not been discussed. Many of the members of both groups saw little common ground between the two parties. Furthermore, opinion polls did not necessarily reflect that there was a significant advantage to an alliance. LPR and SRP therefore decided to start independently of each other at the early 21 October legislative elections. LPR joined forces with Real Politics Union and Right of the Republic to form a new alliance called League of the Right of the Republic (Liga Prawicy Rzeczypospolitej).

Conservative parties in Poland
Catholic political parties
Defunct political party alliances in Poland
Nationalist parties in Poland
National Democracy